Wen Chang, Wen-chang, Wenchang, or variation, may refer to:

Places
 Wenchang a county-level city in Hainan, China
 Wenchang Village, Ren-ai District, Keelung, Taiwan
 216343 Wenchang, the asteroid Wen Chang, the 216343th minor planet registered
 Wén Chāng, a constellation in Chinese astronomy, found in the Purple Forbidden enclosure
 Wenchang Subdistrict (disambiguation), the subdistrict of Wenchang, the name of several subdistricts in China

Facilities and structures
 Wenchang Spacecraft Launch Site, Wenchang, Hainan, China
 Wenchang railway station, Wenchang, Hainan, China
 Beitun Wenchang Temple, temple in Beitun, Taichung, Taiwan
 Miaoli Wenchang Temple, temple in Miaoli City, Miaoli County, Taiwan
 Jhen Wen Academy, formerly Wen Chang Temple, Xiluo Township, Yunlin County, Taiwan
 Wenchang Pavilion, in the Changchun Confucius Temple, Nanguan, Changchun, Jilin, China
 Wenchang, a historic place in Niangziguan Town, Pingding, Shanxi, China

People
 Prince of Wenchang, a title held by the 6th Prince of Yi of Ming dynasty
 Duan Wenchang (773-835; ; Wen-chang DUAN) the Duke of Zouping
 Ding Wenchang (born 1933; ; Wen-chang DING) a general of the People's Liberation Army Air Force
 Hong Wen-chang (1927-2010; ; Wen-chang HONG), the stage name of Taiwanese singer Ang It-hong
 Song Wen-chang (Wen-chang SONG), Taiwanese ambassador to Kiribati; see List of ambassadors of China to Kiribati
 Tse Wen Chang (born 1947; ; Wen Chang TSE) a Taiwanese immunologist
 Xu Wenchang (1521-1593; ; Wen-chang XU) a Ming Dynasty artist
 Yen Wen-chang (born 1947; ; Wen-chang YEN) a Taiwanese politician
 Lawrence Zhang Wen-Chang (1920-2012; Wen-Chang ZHANG / Lawrence ZHANG) a Chinese Roman Catholic priest

Religious
 Wenchang Wang, a Chinese Deity; the God of Culture and Literature

Fictional characters
 Zhao Wenchang (Wen-chang ZHAO), a fictional character from the 2009 Chinese TV show , Chinese Paladin 3 (TV series)

Other uses
 Wenchang dialect, a subdialect of Hainanese, itself a dialect of Chinese
 wénchǎng, an element of religion in China

See also

 Wencheng (disambiguation)
 Changwen (disambiguation)
 Chang (disambiguation)
 Wen (disambiguation)